Sotan may refer to
an inhabitant of Minnesota
the highest hill on the island of Barra Head (Berneray), Scotland
Oguri Sōtan (1413–81), a painter of Japan's Kanō school
Sotan Drama